Snigdha is an Indian actress and singer. She began her career as a singer and later became a well-known actress in Tollywood with Ala Modalaindi. She has also acted in Tamil and Kannada films.

Early life
Snigdha was born in Rajahmundry, Andhra Pradesh, to Jagadeesh, a doctor, and Rajeswari, a housewife. She pursued her MBA at CR Reddy College in Eluru. Before getting into movies, she worked as HR Manager at Logic Bytes in Hyderabad.

Career
She started her acting career with B. V. Nandini Reddy's directorial debut film, Ala Modalaindi. She played the role of Pinky, the mutual friend of the lead characters of the movie, Nani and Nithya Menon. In 2012, she appeared in 4 movies, Mem Vayasuku Vacham, Routine Love Story, Kittu Unnadu Jagratha and Dhammu.

Apart from acting, she has composed music for commercials, and short films. She is also a singer.

Snigdha started her career as a musician with the composition of a title song for Bunty Garu (Chakravakam) in a TV serial ‘Nijamga’. Later she turned into a playback singer with the song ‘Vela Vela’ for Anil in ‘Sambhavami Yuge Yuge’. She also participated in Okkare (ETV) and gained popularity on the small screen, after which she anchored for Okkare Little Stars. She has performed in the USA, Muscat, Malaysia, the UK, Rajahmundry, Chennai, New Delhi, Mumbai, Vijayawada, Vizag, Guntur, Tirupathi & Hyderabad and has released several pop albums.

After the success of Oh! Baby,  in 2021, she acted in You Avakay Me Ice Cream, a rom-com webseries directed by Bhargav Dasari.

Filmography

Filmography

Discography

Award 
Snigdha won the prestigious Nandi Award for the best female comedian for the year 2014 for the movie Jatha Kalise.

References

External links
 

Actresses from Andhra Pradesh
Living people
Actresses from Rajahmundry
People from Rajahmundry
Actresses in Telugu cinema
Indian film actresses
21st-century Indian actresses
1981 births